True Heaven is a 1929 American drama film directed by James Tinling, written by Malcolm Stuart Boylan and Dwight Cummins, and starring George O'Brien, Lois Moran, Phillips Smalley, Oscar Apfel, Duke Martin, and André Cheron. It was released on February 17, 1929, by Fox Film Corporation.

Plot
In Belgium during World War I, a British officer becomes romantically attached to a café singer who turns out to be a German spy.

Cast
George O'Brien as Lieutenant Philip Gresson
Lois Moran as Judith
Phillips Smalley as British Colonel Mason
Oscar Apfel as German General
Duke Martin as British Sergeant Major
André Cheron as British Spy
Donald MacKenzie as British Colonel
Hedwiga Reicher as Madame Grenot
Will Stanton as Gresson's Chauffeur

References

External links 
 

1929 films
1920s English-language films
Fox Film films
1929 drama films
Films directed by James Tinling
American black-and-white films
American World War I films
Films set in Belgium
1920s American films
English-language drama films